Margaret Sullivan may refer to 

Margaret Frances Sullivan (1847–1903), Irish-born American author, journalist, and editor
Margaret Sullivan (journalist), American journalist
Margaret Sullivan (bureaucrat) (born 1962), American politician and agency officer
Margaret Virginia Sullivan (1851–1926), American-Australian actress

See also
Margaret Sullavan (1909–1960), American actress